The House of Ispahbudhan or the House of Aspahbadh was one of the seven Parthian clans of the Sasanian Empire. Like the Sasanians, they claimed descent from the Achaemenid dynasty. They also claimed descent from the legendary Kayanid figure Isfandiyar, who was the son of Vishtaspa, who according to Zoroastrian sources was one of Zoroaster's early followers.

Origin and ancestry
The family traced its descent back to military marshals (spahbed), and occupied important offices in the realm. According to a romanticized legend about their origin, a daughter of the Parthian/Arsacid king Phraates IV, named Koshm, married a "general of all Iranians"; their offspring bore the title of "Aspahpet Pahlav", later forming the Ispahbudhan clan. Through their Arsacid lineage, the Ispahbudhan claimed to be descendants of the Kayanian kings Dara II and Esfandiyar.

History
Under the Sasanians, the Ispahbudhan enjoyed such a high status that they were acknowledged as "kin and partners of the Sasanians". Although the hereditary homeland of the Ispahbudhan seems to have been Khorasan, the family in the course of time came to rule the northwestern quarter (kust) of Adurbadagan (not to be confused with the namesake province of Adurbadagan). The family included many powerful men in the Sasanian Empire closely related to the House of Sasan, such as- Farrukh Hormizd, Farrukhzad, Rostam Farrokhzad, Vistahm, Isfandyadh etc.

Resistance against the Arabs
In 651, the Arabs invaded Adurbadagan, which was the domain of the Ispahbudhan brothers Isfandyadh and Bahram. Isfandyadh made a stand against the Arabs, where a battle was fought. He was, however, defeated and captured by the Arabs. While Isfandyadh was in captivity, he told the Arab general Bukayr ibn Abdallah, that if he sought to conquer Adurbadagan easily and peacefully, he should make peace with him. According to Bal'ami, Isfandyadh is known to have said that: "If you [were to] kill me all of Adurbadagan [will] rise in avenging my blood, and will wage war against you." The Arab general accepted Isfandyadh's advice and made peace with him. However, Bahram, the brother of Isfandyadh, refused to submit to the Arab forces and kept resisting them. Although, he was quickly defeated by the Arabs, and was forced to flee from Adurbadagan. Adurbadagan thus came under Arab suzerainty.

See also 
 Ispahbads of Gilan

References

Sources